The provinces of Burundi are subdivided into 119 communes. The communes are further subdivided into collines.

Burundi’s provinces and communes were created on Christmas Day in 1959 by a Belgian colonial decree. They replaced the pre-existing system of chieftains.

In July 2022, the government of Burundi announced a complete overhaul of the country’s territorial subdivisions. The proposed change would reduce the amounts of provinces from 18 to 5, and reduce the amount of communes from 119 to 42. The change needs the approval of the National Assembly and the Senate to take effect.

The communes are listed below, by province:

Bubanza 
 Commune of Bubanza
 Commune of Gihanga
 Commune of Musigati
 Commune of Mpanda
 Commune of Rugazi

Bujumbura Mairie 
 Commune of Muha
 Commune of Mukaza
 Commune of Ntahangwa

Bujumbura Rural 
 Commune of Isale
 Commune of Kabezi
 Commune of Kanyosha
 Commune of Mubimbi
 Commune of Mugongomanga
 Commune of Mukike
 Commune of Mutambu
 Commune of Mutimbuzi
 Commune of Nyabiraba

Bururi 
 Commune of Bururi
 Commune of Matana
 Commune of Mugamba
 Commune of Rutovu
 Commune of Songa
 Commune of Vyanda

Cankuzo 
 Commune of Cankuzo
 Commune of Cendajuru
 Commune of Gisagara
 Commune of Kigamba
 Commune of Mishiha

Cibitoke 
 Commune of Buganda
 Commune of Bukinanyana
 Commune of Mabayi
 Commune of Mugina
 Commune of Murwi
 Commune of Rugombo

Gitega 
 Commune of Bugendana
 Commune of Bukirasazi
 Commune of Buraza
 Commune of Giheta
 Commune of Gishubi
 Commune of Gitega
 Commune of Itaba
 Commune of Makebuko
 Commune of Mutaho
 Commune of Nyanrusange
 Commune of Ryansoro

Karuzi 
 Commune of Bugenyuzi
 Commune of Buhiga
 Commune of Gihogazi
 Commune of Gitaramuka
 Commune of Mutumba
 Commune of Nyabikere
 Commune of Shombo

Kayanza 
 Commune of Butaganzwa
 Commune of Gahombo
 Commune of Gatara
 Commune of Kabarore
 Commune of Kayanza
 Commune of Matongo
 Commune of Muhanga
 Commune of Muruta
 Commune of Rango

Kirundo 
 Commune of Bugabira
 Commune of Busoni
 Commune of Bwambarangwe
 Commune of Gitobe
 Commune of Kirundo
 Commune of Ntega
 Commune of Vumbi

Makamba 
 Commune of Kayogoro
 Commune of Kibago
 Commune of Mabanda
 Commune of Makamba
 Commune of Nyanza-Lac
 Commune of Vugizo

Muramvya 
 Commune of Bukeye
 Commune of Kiganda
 Commune of Mbuye
 Commune of Muramvya
 Commune of Rutegama

Muyinga 
 Commune of Buhinyuza
 Commune of Butihinda
 Commune of Gashoho
 Commune of Gasorwe
 Commune of Giteranyi
 Commune of Muyinga
 Commune of Mwakiro

Mwaro 
 Commune of Bisoro
 Commune of Gisozi
 Commune of Kayokwe
 Commune of Ndava
 Commune of Nyabihanga
 Commune of Rusaka

Ngozi 
 Commune of Busiga
 Commune of Gashikanwa
 Commune of Kiremba
 Commune of Marangara
 Commune of Mwumba
 Commune of Ngozi
 Commune of Nyamurenza
 Commune of Ruhororo
 Commune of Tangara

Rumonge 
 Commune of Bugarama
 Commune of Burambi
 Commune of Buyengero
 Commune of Muhuta
 Commune of Rumonge

Rutana 
 Commune of Bukemba
 Commune of Giharo
 Commune of Gitanga
 Commune of Mpinga-Kayove
 Commune of Musongati
 Commune of Rutana

Ruyigi 
 Commune of Butaganzwa
 Commune of Butezi
 Commune of Bweru
 Commune of Gisuru
 Commune of Kinyinya
 Commune of Nyabitsinda
 Commune of Ruyigi

References

See also 
 Provinces of Burundi
 Collines of Burundi

 
Subdivisions of Burundi
Lists of subdivisions of Burundi
Burundi 2
Communes, Burundi